The southern pochard (Netta erythrophthalma) is a species of duck, and a member of the genus Netta. There are two subspecies, the South American (southern) pochard N. e. erythrophthalma (Wied-Neuwied, 1833) and the African (southern) pochard N. e. brunnea (Eyton, 1838).

The South American pochard has a fragmented range and is found from Colombia, Venezuela, Brazil, Ecuador, Peru, Bolivia and Argentina to Chile. Here it occurs in a wide variety of shallow fresh waters with submerged vegetation, from the lowlands up to 3,700 metres.

The African pochard occurs from the Cape to the Ethiopian highlands on water bodies with or without emergent vegetation. They are suspected to have been strong migrants in the past but the construction of numerous farm dams seems to allow them a more sedentary lifestyle. They reach highest concentrations in Africa's central plateaus and in the south-western winter rainfall region.

Taxonomy
Two syntype specimens of Nyroca brunnea Eyton (Monogr. Anat., 1838, p.161., pl.23.), the African Southern Pochard, are held in the vertebrate zoology collections of National Museums Liverpool at World Museum, with accession numbers NML-VZ D832 (male adult) and NML-VZ D832a (female adult). The specimens were collected in South Africa and came to the Liverpool national collection via Thomas Campbell Eyton’s collection and the 13th Earl of Derby’s collection which was bequeathed to the city of Liverpool. There are two other syntype specimens, including NHMUK 1845.7.6.271, in the Natural History Museum at Tring.

Habits
Southern pochards are sociable and gregarious. They have been seen in groups of up to 5,000.

Mating and nesting
The birds are solitary nesters, building nests out of leaves and stems on the banks of a river surrounded by vegetation. The female southern pochard lays a clutch consisting of six to fifteen eggs. The female incubates the eggs for 20 to 28 days. Once the eggs hatch, the mother leads them immediately to water.

Eating habits
The southern pochard eats mainly aquatic plants, which it finds when diving. The adults also feed on larvae, pupae, aquatic animals and plant material.

Conservation status 
The southern pochard population has been steadily declining since the 1970s. In 2016, the number of southern pochards was reported at around 25,000 in South America, but this could have been an overestimate due to a lack of data.

References

External links

 Species text in The Atlas of Southern African Birds.

southern pochard
Birds of South America
Birds of Sub-Saharan Africa
southern pochard
southern pochard